Moberly is a city in Randolph County, Missouri, United States. The population was 13,974 at the 2010 census. It is part of the Columbia, Missouri metropolitan area.

History

Moberly was founded in 1866, and named after Colonel William E. Moberly, the first president of the Chariton and Randolph County railroads.

Moberly, the "Magic City", grew from the town platted by the North Missouri Railroad (later part of the Wabash Railroad) in 1866 to a transportation center with a 6,070 population by 1880.  The North Mo. acquired the site when it took over the Chariton and Randolph R.R. after the Civil War.  In 1860, the C.& R. had planned a road west to Brunswick from this point on the North Mo. then reaching toward Iowa.

The Chariton and Randolph R. R. named its proposed junction for William Moberly, head of the railroad, and offered free land to residents of once nearby Allen to settle here.  Patrick Lynch, who alone accepted, was given two lots by the North Missouri after the Civil War for holding the site without "the loss of a life or a house."

Moberly has been a division point since 1867 when the North Mo. (Wabash) reached Brunswick.  Huge railroad repair shops, one of the earliest railroad plants west of the Mississippi, were opened, 1872.  The M. K. & T. formed a junction here, 1873.  Transportation facilities brought industrial growth and the development of the soil, fire clay, and coal resources of the area.

Moberly lies in a glacial plains area in a county organized, 1829, and names for John Randolph of Roanoke, Va. In Missouri's Little Dixie Region, it was first settled by William Holman, 1818.  William Fort boiled salt at a spring near Huntsville in 1820s/  The Bee Trace, a pioneer trail, ran along the Grand Divide (the high point in The Grand Prairie) between the Missouri and Mississippi through the county.  The Iowa, Sac, and Fox tribes gave up claims to the region, 1824.

At Huntsville, county seat, since 1831, a plank road was built to Glasgow, 1854, and the 1855-82 Mt. Pleasant (Baptist) College was founded.  County legal business has been conducted at Huntsville and Moberly since 1885.  Moberly Junior College opened, 1927.

On Sunday, November 16, 1919, four African-Americans were lynched in Moberly. Three were able to escape but one was shot to death.

World War II Gen. Omar N. Bradley, first Chairman Joint Chiefs of Staff, was born in nearby Clark.  Moberly's airport is named for him.  Moberly is the home of novelist Elizabeth Seifert Gasparotti and birthplace of writer Jack Conroy.  G.W. P. Hunt, first Governor of Arizona, was born in Huntsville.  Hancock L. Jackson, interim Gov. of Mo., 1857; Lt. Gov., 1857–61, and the biochemist Victor C. Vaughn, were natives of Randolph County.

The Missouri state Moberly Correctional Center was constructed two miles south of Moberly in 1963 as a minimum-security prison. As of 2014, it houses about 1800 minimum and medium security inmates.

On Independence Day, 1995, a tornado ripped through downtown Moberly. There were no reported deaths, but there was a large amount of structural damage. Another tornado hit nearby Renick on March 12, 2006. Four people were killed and thirteen were injured in the F3-level tornado. Dozens of homes were destroyed.

The World War II-era US Navy frigate  was named for the town. The ship participated mostly in convoy escort, earning a battle star for her assistance in sinking a German submarine, U-853.

The Burkholder-O'Keefe House, Moberly Commercial Historic District, and Moberly Junior High School are listed on the National Register of Historic Places.

Government
The city of Moberly was born of a railroad auction on September 27, 1866. The county incorporated the town in 1868 with a board of trustees. The same year that the Wabash Railroad, St. Louis & Pacific Railway shops were finished in Moberly, the city entered a charter into state record and incorporated. At the time, there was no such thing as a council-manager government, but the 1950s saw the government form come into vogue in Missouri. Now, the city of Moberly has a council-manager government. The council consists of five members elected for three-year terms and one city counselor who drafts ordinances and acts as legal counsel. Each year, the council elects one of its members as mayor and one as mayor pro tempore to serve for one year. To manage the city and oversee day-to-day operations, the council selects a city manager. In 2015, the government had these officers:

City Council
Jerry Jeffrey, Mayor
Tim Brubaker, Mayor pro tempore
Austin Kyser
John Kimmons
Brandon Lucas
Randall Thompson, City Counselor
Brian Crane, City Manager

Geography
Moberly is in southeast Randolph County at the intersection of U.S. Route 63 and U.S. Route 24. Nearby streams include Sugar Creek to the northwest, Coon Creek to the east and Sweet Spring Creek to the southwest.

Climate

Demographics

The Moberly Micropolitan Statistical Area consists of Randolph County.

2010 census
As of the census of 2010, there were 13,974 people, 4,960 households, and 3,019 families residing in the city. The racial makeup of the city was 86.4% White, 9.7% African American, 0.4% Native American, 0.6% Asian, 0.3% from other races, and 2.6% from two or more races. Hispanic or Latino of any race were 2.1% of the population.

There were 4,960 households, of which 32.5% had children under the age of 18 living with them, 40.1% were married couples living together, 15.9% had a female householder with no husband present, 4.8% had a male householder with no wife present, and 39.1% were non-families. 33.4% of all households were made up of individuals, and 14.1% had someone living alone who was 65 years of age or older. The average household size was 2.35 and the average family size was 2.97.

The median age in the city was 35.7 years. 22% of residents were under the age of 18; 10.9% were between the ages of 18 and 24; 29.7% were from 25 to 44; 23.5% were from 45 to 64; and 13.9% were 65 years of age or older. The gender makeup of the city was 53.8% male and 46.2% female.

2000 census
As of the census of 2000, there were 11,945 people, 5,001 households, and 3,090 families residing in the city. The population density was 1,033.8 people per square mile (399.3/km2). There were 5,812 housing units at an average density of 503.0 per square mile (194.3/km2). The racial makeup of the city was 90.51% White, 6.71% African American, 0.37% Native American, 0.64% Asian, 0.03% Pacific Islander, 0.39% from other races, and 1.34% from two or more races. Hispanic or Latino of any race were 1.67% of the population.

There were 5,001 households, out of which 29.3% had children under the age of 18 living with them, 44.2% were married couples living together, 13.6% had a female householder with no husband present, and 38.2% were non-families. 33.2% of all households were made up of individuals, and 16.1% had someone living alone who was 65 years of age or older. The average household size was 2.30 and the average family size was 2.89.

In the city, the population was spread out, with 24.8% under the age of 18, 11.1% from 18 to 24, 25.4% from 25 to 44, 20.1% from 45 to 64, and 18.7% who were 65 years of age or older. The median age was 36 years. For every 100 females, there were 86.6 males. For every 100 females age 18 and over, there were 80.8 males.

The median income for a household in the city was $28,519, and the median income for a family was $37,488. Males had a median income of $27,152 versus $19,508 for females. The per capita income for the city was $15,478. About 11.1% of families and 15.0% of the population were below the poverty line, including 20.5% of those under age 18 and 14.7% of those age 65 or over.

Recreation

 Moberly Parks and Recreation operates approximately 500 acres of parkland through five parks including maintained grounds, forest, lakes, the Howard Hils Athletic Complex consisting of eight baseball/softball fields and three football/soccer fields, the Moberly Aquatic Center, Thompson Campground, The Lodge, Municipal Auditorium, the Magic City Line - a one mile long miniature train track, over two miles of paved trails, boat ramps, fishing lakes, paddleboat/canoe rentals, and shelters.
 Moberly Midget League has provided a summer baseball program for the local youth since 1950. The program currently ranges from 8U to 14U.
 The Moberly Optimist Club has provided a summer youth baseball for decades. The program currently ranges from T-ball to 8U.
 The Randolph County Historical Society has its headquarters in Moberly, and has two museums: one dedicated to county history and genealogy, and another dedicated to the Wabash, MKT, and CB&Q railroads.

Education
Moberly is home to two colleges; Central Christian College of the Bible and Moberly Area Community College. The Moberly School District consists of seven schools. The Early Childhood Center serves preschoolers; North and South Park Elementary serve grades K-2; grades 3-5 attend Gratz Brown Elementary; grades 6-8 attend Moberly Middle School; and Moberly High School and Moberly Area Technical Center serve grades 9–12. East Park School serves as an alternative school. The Seventh-day Adventist church operates Maranatha Adventist School, a K-8 school. The St. Pius X Catholic Elementary School, operated by the Catholic Church of the same name, serves grade K-8.

Moberly has a public library, a branch of the Little Dixie Regional Libraries.

Transportation

Moberly is served by The Omar Bradley Airport.  Commercial service is available 33 miles to the south in Columbia at the Columbia Regional Airport or the MO-X (an airport shuttle to and from STL and MCI), 60 miles to the south in Jefferson City via the Amtrak station, 45 miles to the north in La Plata via the Amtrak station, or 55 miles to the North in Kirksville at the Kirksville Regional Airport.

The city is served by U.S. Route 63 to the east on a bypass.  The old route is designated as both Business 63 and Morley Street and goes through town. U.S. Route 24 goes through town as well.  Route M (formerly Route 3) also skirts the edge of town. Other routes include Route DD (indirectly goes to Sugar Creek Lake), EE, A, and AA (past the prison). At one time there was a Business 24 that ran from Morley Street via West Coates Street to Johnson Street to Concannon Street turning North on Holman St to current U.S. 24. This route was de-numbered in the late 1960s. State Route 22 was also multiplexed with U.S. 63 to U.S. 24. When U.S. 63 was re-routed in the mid-1960s Highway 22 was truncated to its current end at U.S. 63 near Sturgeon, MO.

The Norfolk Southern Railway serves Moberly running west toward Kansas City, Missouri and east toward Hannibal, Missouri and points on.  Norfolk Southern also runs south between Moberly and St. Louis, Missouri (via Centralia and Mexico, MO) and points on.  Moberly was once the northern terminus of the Missouri-Kansas-Texas Railroad that ran between Moberly and Boonville, Missouri. Much of this route is still somewhat visible in satellite images.

Moberly is home to one of Norfolk Southern's many rail yards. Norfolk Southern used to have a line that ran north from Moberly to Albia, Iowa, but it was abandoned in the spring of 1992.  The line was reopened from 1993–1995 to help in recovery efforts after the great Flood of 1993.  By 1997, the line was dismantled between Moberly and Moulton, Iowa.

The Centerville, Iowa-owned Appanoose County Community Railroad currently operates the section from Moulton to Albia, Iowa.

Media
Moberly is served by a daily newspaper, the Moberly Monitor-Index. The Kwix Kres Kirk radio station operates from downtown.

Notable people
 George W. Althouse, Nebraska state legislator
 Russ Ball, NFL executive
 Omar Bradley, United States Army general
 Brent Briscoe, actor
 David Clohessy, executive director of SNAP, the Survivors Network of those Abused by Priests
 Jack Conroy, author and activist
 Jerry Doggett, sports broadcaster
 Maud Durbin, actress
 Jered Eames, musician
 Brad Hunt, actor
 Leroy Matlock, baseball pitcher in the Negro leagues
 Dennis L. McKiernan, author
 Hartman Rector Jr., former LDS General Authority
 Luann Ridgeway, politician
 Melvin B. Tolson, poet and professor at Wiley College, poet laureate of Liberia

References

External links

City of Moberly
Moberly Area Economic Development Corporation
 Historic maps of Moberly in the Sanborn Maps of Missouri Collection at the University of Missouri
 

Cities in Randolph County, Missouri
Cities in Missouri
Columbia metropolitan area (Missouri)
Populated places established in 1866
1866 establishments in Missouri